Omar Yousfi (born 18 May 1956) is an Algerian weightlifter. He competed at the 1980 Summer Olympics and the 1988 Summer Olympics.

References

External links
 

1956 births
Living people
Algerian male weightlifters
Olympic weightlifters of Algeria
Weightlifters at the 1980 Summer Olympics
Weightlifters at the 1988 Summer Olympics
Place of birth missing (living people)
21st-century Algerian people
20th-century Algerian people